David Adolph Korn (born September 1, 1930) is a former American diplomat, former United States Ambassador to Togo, author, and foreign service officer. He was appointed to his ambassadorship position on October 16, 1986, and left that post on April 4, 1988.

David Korn was born in Wichita Falls, Texas. He attended Joplin Junior College and the University of Missouri. He holds degrees from the Institut d'Etudes Politiques in Paris, France, 1953–1956, and the Johns Hopkins School of Advanced International Studies, 1957. Korn is fluent in French, Hebrew, and Arabic. He served in the United States Army from 1951 to 1953.

Korn joined the Foreign Service in September 1957 after serving briefly as a desk officer for North Africa at the International Administration, the predecessor of USAID. Later that year he was assigned as political officer to the U.S. Embassy in Paris, France. He returned to Washington D.C. in 1959 to serve in the State Department's Executive Secretariat. From 1961 to 1963, Korn was political officer at the U.S. Embassy in Beirut, Lebanon. From there, in 1963 to 1964, he took Arabic language training at the American consulate in Tangier, Morocco; and from 1964 to 1965, he served as Chargé d'Affaires and political officer at the U.S. Embassy in Nouakchott, Mauritania. He then returned as desk officer for Arabian peninsula affairs from 1965 to 1967.

Korn was then assigned to the U.S. Embassy in Tel Aviv, Israel, in 1967, where he took Hebrew language training before serving as political officer from 1968 to 1969 and chief of the political section from January 1970 to August 1971. Then from 1971 to 1972, he took mid-career training at Princeton University and then returned to the Department as Office Director for northern Arab affairs from 1972 to 1975. Korn was appointed American consul general in Calcutta, India, from 1975 to 1977. He served as a member of the policy planning staff in 1978; became officer director for Arab-Israeli affairs from 1978 to 1981; and was assigned to the Bureau of African Affairs, from 1981 to 1982. From 1982 to 1985, Korn was Chargé d'Affaires and ad interim at the U.S. Embassy in Addis Ababa, Ethiopia, and in 1985–1986 was a fellow at Chatham House in London, England.

His father was Thomas Adolph Korn and his mother was Iris Dobson. David Korn was divorced from Susan K. Palmer in 1981 and is married to Roberta Cohen, currently a non-resident senior fellow at the Brookings Institution.

Published works 
Since 1986 to 1990, David Korn has published 6 books mainly published by Routledge, Southern Illinois University Press, Indiana University Press, Westview Press, Brookings Institution Press, Yale University Press, Human Rights Watch, Institute for the Study of Diplomacy, Georgetown University School of Foreign Service, and the Defense Academic Research Support Program and The Middle East Institute.

See also 
United States Ambassador to Togo

References 

Living people
1930 births
Paul H. Nitze School of Advanced International Studies alumni
Ambassadors of the United States to Togo
Chatham House people
United States Foreign Service personnel